Take Them On, On Your Own is the second studio album by American rock band Black Rebel Motorcycle Club. It was first released in the UK on August 25, 2003, and in the US on September 2, 2003. The album was reissued with bonus tracks in 2008. The album cover is a homage to the film The Third Man.

The album has a darker, harder rock sound than their debut album, and also contains more politically themed lyrics. The album reached #3 in the United Kingdom music charts despite receiving mixed reviews, and is almost universally credited as a lesser achievement than its predecessor B.R.M.C..

The 2003 release of this album contained the Copy Control protection system in some regions. The 2008 Japanese and European CD reissue contains three bonus tracks: "Take Them On, On Your Own", "High / Low", and "Waiting Here".

Track listing

Japanese 2008 Bonus tracks 
 Take Them On, On Your Own" - 5:27
 "High / Low" - 4:03 
 "Waiting Here" - 3:49

Credits

 Bass, Guitar, Vocals – Robert Turner
 Drums, Percussion – Nick Jago
 Guitar, Bass, Vocals – Peter Hayes
 Lyrics by – Peter Hayes, Robert Turner 
 Music by – Black Rebel Motorcycle Club
 Engineer – Black Rebel Motorcycle Club, Ric Simpson 
 Engineering Assistant – Ben Thackeray 
 Mastered by – Mike Lazer 
 Mastered by [per etching] – Paul Stubblebine 
 Mixed by – Black Rebel Motorcycle Club, Ken Andrews (tracks: 1 to 4, 6, 8, 10 to 13) 
 Mixed by (assistant)– Justin Smith  (tracks: 1 to 4, 6, 8, 10 to 13) 
 Producer – Black Rebel Motorcycle Club
 (additional) Recording by – Ken Andrews

Notes
 
 
Recorded at Mayfair Studios (in Primrose Hill), B.R.M.C. Studio, and The Fortress (in London).
Additional recording at Exstacy Recording Studios (in North Hollywood).  -Comes with lyrics inner sleeves.

Chart performance

References

2003 albums
Black Rebel Motorcycle Club albums